Impiegati, internationally released as Bank Clerks, is a 1985 Italian comedy-drama film written and directed by Pupi Avati. It was selected for the Quinzaine des Realisateurs in the 1985 Cannes Film Festival. For her performance Elena Sofia Ricci won a Globo d'oro for Best New Actress.

Cast 
 Claudio Botosso: Luigi
 Giovanna Maldotti: Marcella
 Dario Parisini: Dario
 Elena Sofia Ricci: Annalisa
 Luca Barbareschi: Enrico
 Consuelo Ferrara: Valeria
 Gianni Musy: Pozzi
 Cesare Barbetti: Padre di Dario
 Alessandro Partexano: Alex
 Nik Novecento: Usciere
 Marcello Cesena: Bebo

References

External links
 

1985 films
Films about businesspeople
Italian comedy-drama films
Commedia all'italiana
Films directed by Pupi Avati
Films scored by Riz Ortolani
1985 comedy-drama films
1980s Italian-language films
1980s Italian films